Charles Wesley Squires (1851–1934), also known as C.W. Squires, was an American architect.
A number of his works are listed on the National Register of Historic Places.

Works by architect Charles W. Squires Charles Squires, of Emporia, Kansas,  include:
Anderson Carnegie Memorial Library, The Way College of Emporia, 1300 W. Twelfth Ave., Emporia, KS, NRHP-listed
Burns Union School, SW corner Ohio and Main Sts., Burns, KS, NRHP-listed
Dodge City Public Library, 2nd and Spruce Aves., Dodge City, KS, NRHP-listed
Greenwood Hotel, 300 N. Main, Eureka, KS, NRHP-listed
Hutchinson Public Carnegie Library, 427 N. Main, Hutchinson, KS, NRHP-listed 
Keebler-Stone House, 831 Constitution St., Emporia, KS, NRHP-listed
Lincoln County Courthouse, 3rd and Lincoln Ave., Lincoln, KS, NRHP-listed 
Hallie B. Soden House, 802 S. Commercial St., Emporia, KS, NRHP-listed
One or more works in Peabody Downtown Historic District, along Walnut St. between Division and First Sts., Peabody, KS, NRHP-listed

See also
Frank C. Squires

References

1851 births
1934 deaths
Architects from Kansas